The first season of Law & Order premiered on NBC on September 13, 1990, and concluded on June 9, 1991. The season consists of 22 episodes. It was the only season to feature George Dzundza as Max Greevey. It was the first season to include a longer opening sequence and theme (at 81 seconds). And it was also the first season to include Chris Noth as Junior Detective Mike Logan, 
Dann Florek as Captain Donald Cragen, Michael Moriarty as Executive Assistant District Attorney Ben Stone, Richard Brooks as Assistant District Attorney Paul Robinette and Steven Hill as District Attorney Adam Schiff.

Overview
Everybody's Favorite Bagman was produced in 1988 on CBS and was the pilot episode of the series. It was directed by John Tiffin Patterson and written by Dick Wolf. However, NBC decided to air "Prescription for Death" as the premiere episode instead.

Cast

Main Cast
 George Dzundza as Senior Detective Sergeant Max Greevey
 Chris Noth as Junior Detective Mike Logan
 Dann Florek as Captain Donald Cragen
 Michael Moriarty as Executive Assistant District Attorney Ben Stone
 Richard Brooks as Assistant District Attorney Paul Robinette
 Steven Hill as District Attorney Adam Schiff

Guest Stars
S. Epatha Merkerson as Denise Winters,
One future core cast-member actress made her first appearance in the episode "Mushrooms". S. Epatha Merkerson appeared as Denise Winters, the mother of the victims. She would later appear in Season 4 as Lieutenant Anita Van Buren, commander of the 27th Precinct Detective Squad, and play the role for 17 seasons from 1993-2010.

Episodes

References

01
1990 American television seasons
1991 American television seasons